This is a list of CMT Music Awards (and predecessors) ceremonies and the winners in each ceremony. The show began as the Music City News Awards in 1967. The award show partnered with the Grand Ole Opry-owned The Nashville Network (TNN) in 1990 to become the TNN Music City News Country Awards. After Music City News ceased publication in 1999, Country Weekly assumed the role of presenting sponsor of the awards show in 2000. In 2001, after MTV acquired CBS' cable operations, the show moved to CMT, where it was retooled and renamed to the CMT Flameworthy Video Music Awards in 2002. The name of the show was changed to CMT Music Awards in 2005.

Ceremonies
Below is a list of ceremonies, the years the ceremonies were held, their hosts, the television networks that aired them, and their locations:

CMT Music Awards

Music City News Awards and TNN Music City News Country Awards

Categorical winners
Below is a list of winners in the major categories by year.

2020s
2021 CMT Music Awards

2020 CMT Music Awards

2010s
2019 CMT Music Awards

2018 CMT Music Awards

2017 CMT Music Awards

2016 CMT Music Awards

  In 2016, Collaborative Video of the Year did not nominated.

2015 CMT Music Awards

2014 CMT Music Awards

2013 CMT Music Awards

2012 CMT Music Awards

2011 CMT Music Awards

2010 CMT Music Awards

2000s

2009 CMT Music Awards

 
2008 CMT Music Awards

2007 CMT Music Awards

2006 CMT Music Awards

2005 CMT Music Awards

2004 CMT Flameworthy Video Music Awards

2003 CMT Flameworthy Video Music Awards

2002 CMT Flameworthy Video Music Awards

2001 TNN & CMT Country Weekly Music Awards

2000 Country Weekly Presents the TNN Music Awards

1990s
1999 TNN Music City News Country Awards

1998 TNN Music City News Country Awards

1997 TNN Music City News Country Awards

1996 TNN Music City News Country Awards

1995 TNN Music City News Country Awards

1994 TNN Music City News Country Awards

1993 TNN Music City News Country Awards

1992 TNN Music City News Country Awards

1991 TNN Music City News Country Awards

1990 TNN Music City News Country Awards

1980s
1989 Music City News Awards

1988 Music City News Awards

1987 Music City News Awards

1986 Music City News Awards

1985 Music City News Awards

1984 Music City News Awards

1983 Music City News Awards

1982 Music City News Awards

1981 Music City News Awards

1980 Music City News Awards

1970s
1979 Music City News Awards

1978 Music City News Awards

1977 Music City News Awards

1976 Music City News Awards

1975 Music City News Awards

1974 Music City News Awards

1973 Music City News Awards

1972 Music City News Awards

1971 Music City News Awards

1970 Music City News Awards

1960s
1969 Music City News Awards

1968 Music City News Awards

1967 Music City News Awards

References

External links
Official site of the CMT Music Awards

Music-related lists

Lists of award ceremonies